Money Talk may refer to:

 "Money Talk", a 2016 song by T.I.
 "Money Talk", a 2020 song by Rich the Kid featuring YoungBoy Never Broke Again from Boss Man

See also
 Money Talks (disambiguation)